Dalberg Global Development Advisors is a strategy and policy advisory firm. Founded in 2001, the company specializes in global development. Dalberg has worked in over 90 countries with over 400 clients including governments, foundations, international agencies, non-governmental organizations, and Fortune 500 companies. Its mission is to raise living standards in developing countries and mobilize effective responses to the world's most pressing issues.

History
The firm was founded in October 2001 by Henrik Skovby and Søren Peter Andreasen. It now has 24 offices worldwide, including Abu Dhabi, Copenhagen, Dakar, Dar es Salaam, Geneva, Johannesburg, Lagos, London, Mumbai, Nairobi, New Delhi, New York City, San Francisco, Singapore, Washington D.C.  Its clients include corporations, foundations and NGOs operating in emerging and developing markets and national governments.

Projects include studies for the United Nations, World Bank and the President of Liberia. In 2007, the firm collaborated with the Financial Times and the United Nations Global Compact to provide an assessment of the quality of NGOs and the United Nations' agencies that have established working relationships with private-sector companies.

Projects
Dalberg has advised investment funds for organizations and governments in Asia and Africa, including investments in wind energy projects in the People's Republic of China and geothermal energy plants in Indonesia. Dalberg recommended energy-sector reforms to the Government of Montenegro, and advised a U.S. think-tank on the energy markets in Pakistan and the Middle East.

In Tanzania, the firm provided advice on strategies to meet Millennium Development Goals energy targets by 2012. A new drug, known as the Artemisinin-based combination therapies (ACTs), was available to combat malaria, but was largely inaccessible to the masses because of cost and distribution challenges. The World Bank commissioned Dalberg to design a mechanism to reduce the cost of ACTs. In November 2007, the design for the Affordable Medicines Facility-malaria (AMFm) was approved by the Roll Back Malaria (RBM) Partnership Board. Other projects in this sector have included designing initiatives to support people with chronic diseases in developing countries and advising pharmaceutical companies in Venezuela on profitable growth.

References

Further reading

About Dalberg
 America's Most Promising Social Entrepreneurs 2011 - Businessweek 
 Beyond Relief: How the World Failed Haiti
 Reuters

By Dalberg
 .
 . See also John Templeton Foundation and International Finance Corporation
 .
 .
 .
 .
 .
 .
 .

External links

Consulting firms established in 2001
Multinational companies based in New York City
International management consulting firms
Management consulting firms of the United States
Privately held companies based in New York City
Macroeconomics consulting firms